Hebanthe erianthos (many synonyms, including Iresine erianthos and Pfaffia paniculata), known as suma or Brazilian ginseng, is a species of plant in the family Amaranthaceae. The specific epithet is also spelt "eriantha", although the basionym is Iresine erianthos.

The root of this rambling ground vine found in South America is used traditionally as a medicine and tonic.  Nicknamed "para tudo" in Brasil, which means "for everything", suma is a traditional herbal medicine. The indigenous peoples of the Amazon region have used suma root for generations for a wide variety of health purposes, including as a general tonic; as an energy, rejuvenating, and sexual tonic; a calming agent; to treat ulcers; and as a cure-all for at least 300 years.

The root contains phytochemicals including saponins (pfaffosides), pfaffic acid, beta-ecdysterone, glycosides, and nortriterpenes.

See also
 List of plants of Cerrado vegetation of Brazil

References

Amaranthaceae
Flora of Brazil
Flora of Ecuador
Flora of Panama
Flora of Paraguay
Flora of Peru
Flora of Venezuela
Flora of the Amazon
Flora of the Cerrado
Medicinal plants of South America
Plants described in 1813